Lourdes Domínguez Lino was the defending champion, but lost in the second round to Mariana Duque-Mariño.
Lara Arruabarrena Vecino won the title, defeating Alexandra Panova in the final with the score of 6–2, 7–5.
All seeded players lost in the first or second round.

Seeds

Draw

Finals

Top half

Bottom half

Qualifying

Seeds

Qualifiers

Draw

First qualifier

Second qualifier

Third qualifier

Fourth qualifier

References
 Main Draw
 Qualifying Draw

Copa Sony Ericsson Colsanitas - Singles
2012 Singles